The Swedish-speaking population of Finland (whose members are called by many names—see below;) is a linguistic minority in Finland. They maintain a strong identity and are seen either as a separate cultural or ethnic group, while still being considered ethnic Finns, or as a distinct nationality. They speak Finland Swedish, which encompasses both a standard language and distinct dialects that are mutually intelligible with the dialects spoken in Sweden and, to a lesser extent, other Scandinavian languages.

According to Statistics Finland, Swedish is the mother tongue of about 260,000 people in mainland Finland and of about 26,000 people in Åland, a self-governing archipelago off the west coast of Finland, where Swedish speakers constitute a majority. Swedish-speakers comprise 5.2% of the total Finnish population or about 4.9% without Åland. The proportion has been steadily diminishing since the early 19th century, when Swedish was the mother tongue of approximately 15% of the population and considered a prestige language.

According to a 2007 statistical analysis made by Fjalar Finnäs, the population of the minority group is stable, and may even be increasing slightly in total numbers since more parents from bilingual families tend to register their children as Swedish speakers. It is estimated that 70% of bilingual families—that is, ones with one parent Finnish-speaking and the other Swedish-speaking—register their children as Swedish-speaking.

Terminology
The Swedish term  (literally 'Finland's-Swede'), which is used by the group itself, does not have an established English translation. The Society of Swedish Authors in Finland and the main political institutions for the Swedish-speaking minority, such as the Swedish People's Party and Swedish Assembly of Finland, use the expression Swedish-speaking population of Finland, but Swedish-speaking NGOs often use the term Finland-Swedes.

The Research Institute for the Languages of Finland proposes Swedish-speaking Finns, Swedish Finns, or Finland-Swedes, the first of which is the sole form used on the institute's website. Some debators insist for the use of the more traditional English-language form, Finland-Swedes, as they view the labelling of them as Swedish-speaking Finns as a way of depriving them their ethnic affiliation, reducing it to merely a matter of language and de-emphasising the "Swedish part" of Finland-Swedish identity, i.e. their relations to Sweden.

Among Finnish Americans the term Swede-Finn became dominant before the independence of Finland in 1917, and the term has remained common to the present, despite later immigrants tending to use different terms such as Finland-Swede. The expressions Swedish-speaking Finns, Swedes of Finland, Finland Swedes, Finnish Swedes, and Swedish Finns are all used in academic literature.

History

Medieval Swedish colonisation
The first Swedish arrivals in Finland have often been linked to the putative First Swedish Crusade (ca. 1150) which, if it took place, served to expand Christianity and annex Finnish territories to the kingdom of Sweden. Simultaneously the growth of population in Sweden, together with lack of land, resulted in Swedish settlements in Southern and Western coastal areas of Finland. The Second Swedish Crusade against the Tavastians in the 13th century extended the Swedish settlements to Nyland (Uusimaa). During the 14th century, the population expansion from Sweden proper increasingly took the form of organised mass migration: the new settlers came in large numbers in large ships from various parts of Sweden's Eastern coast, from Småland to Hälsingland. Their departure from Sweden proper to Finland was encouraged and organized by the Swedish authorities. The coast of Ostrobothnia received large-scale Swedish settlements during the 13th and 15th centuries, in parallel with events that resulted in Swedish expansion to Norrland and Estonia's coastal area.

Debate about the origin of the Swedish-speaking population in Finland
The origin of the Swedish-speaking population in the territory that today constitutes Finland was a subject of fierce debate in the early 20th century as a part of the Finland's language strife.

In 1966, the historian Hämäläinen (as referenced by McRae 1993) addressed the strong correlation between the scholar's mother-tongue and the views on the Scandinavian settlement history of Finland.
"Whereas Finnish-speaking scholars tended to deny or minimize the presence of Swedish-speakers before the historically documented Swedish expeditions starting from the 12th century, Swedish-speaking scholars have found archeological and philological evidence for a continuous and Swedish or Germanic presence in Finland from pre-historic times."

Since the late 20th century, several Swedish-speaking philologists, archaeologists and historians from Finland have criticized the theories of Germanic/Scandinavian continuity in Finland. Current research has established that the Swedish-speaking population and Swedish place names in Finland date to the Swedish colonisation of Nyland and Ostrobothnia coastal regions of Finland in the 12th and 13th centuries.

Nationalism and language strife

The proportion of Swedish speakers in Finland has declined since the 18th century, when almost 20% spoke Swedish (these 18th-century statistics excluded Karelia and Kexholm County, which were ceded to Russia in 1743, and the northern parts of present-day Finland were counted as part of Norrland). When the Grand Duchy of Finland was formed and Karelia was reunited with Finland, the share of Swedish speakers was 15% of the population.

During the 19th century a national awakening occurred in Finland. It was supported by the Russian central administration for practical reasons, as a security measure to weaken Swedish influence in Finland. This trend was reinforced by the general wave of nationalism in Europe in the mid-19th century. As a result, under the influence of the German idea of one national language, a strong movement arose that promoted the use of the Finnish language in education, research and administration. Many influential Swedish-speaking families learned Finnish, fennicized their names and changed their everyday language to Finnish. This linguistic change had many similarities with the linguistic and cultural revival of 19th century Lithuania where many former Polish speakers expressed their affiliation with the Lithuanian nation by adopting Lithuanian as their spoken language. As the educated class in Finland was almost entirely Swedish-speaking, the first generation of the Finnish nationalists and Fennomans came predominantly from a Swedish-speaking background.

The language issue was not primarily an issue of ethnicity, but an ideological and philosophical issue as to what language policy would best preserve Finland as a nation. This also explains why so many academically educated Swedish speakers changed to Finnish: it was motivated by ideology. Both parties had the same patriotic objectives, but their methods were completely the opposite. The language strife would continue up until World War II.

The majority of the population—both Swedish and Finnish speakers—were farmers, fishermen and other workers. The farmers lived mainly in unilingual areas, while the other workers lived in bilingual areas such as Helsinki. This co-existence gave birth to Helsinki slang—a Finnish slang with novel slang words of Finnish, local and common Swedish and Russian origin. Helsinki was primarily Swedish-speaking until the late 19th century, see further: Fennicization of Helsinki.

The Swedish nationality and quest for territorial recognition
The Finnish-speaking parties, under the lead of Senator E. N. Setälä who played a major role in the drafting the language act (1922) and the language paragraphs (1919) in the Finnish constitution, interpreted the language provisions so that they are not supposed to suggest the existence of two nationalities. According to this view Finland has two national languages but only one nationality. This view was never shared in the Swedish-speaking political circles and paved the way for a linguistic conflict. Contrary to the Finnish-speaking view the leaders of the Swedish nationality movement (Axel Lille and others) maintained that the Swedish population of Finland constituted a nationality of its own and the provisions of the constitution act were seen to support the view. The Finnish-speaking political circles denoted the cultural rights of Finland-Swedes as minority rights. The Finland-Swedish political view emphasized the equality of the Swedish nationality next to the Finnish-speaking nationality and the fact the national languages of Finland were the languages of the respective nationalities of the country, not the languages of the state itself. The concept of minority, although de facto the case for Swedish speakers, was perceived as being against the spirit of the constitution. However, gradually after the Second World War, the concept of minority has been increasingly applied to Swedish speakers, even within the Finland-Swedish political discourse.

The Swedish nationality movement was effectively mobilized during the aftermath of Finnish independence and the civil war that shortly followed. The Swedish assembly of Finland was founded to protect the linguistic integrity of Swedish-speakers and seek fixed territorial guarantees for the Swedish language for those parts of the country where Swedish speakers made up the local majority. The Finnish-speaking parties and leadership studiously avoided self-government for Swedish speakers in the Finnish mainland. Of the broader wishes of the Swedish-speaking political movement only cultural concessions—most notably administrative autonomy for Swedish schools and a Swedish diocese—were realized, which nevertheless were sufficient to prevent more thorough conflict between the ethno-linguistic groups.

Developments since the late 19th century
The urbanization and industrialization that began in the late 19th century increased the interaction between people speaking different languages with each other, especially in the bigger towns. Helsinki ( in Swedish and predominantly used until the late 19th century), named after medieval settlers from the Swedish province of Hälsingland, still mainly Swedish-speaking in the beginning of the 19th century, attracted Finnish-speaking workers, civil servants and university students from other parts of Finland, as did other Swedish-speaking areas. As a result, the originally unilingual Swedish-speaking coastal regions in the province of Nyland were cut into two parts. There was a smaller migration in the opposite direction, and a few Swedish-speaking "islands" emerged in towns like Tampere, Oulu and Kotka.

According to official statistics, Swedish speakers made up 12.9% of the total population of Finland of 2.6 million in 1900. By 1950 their proportion had fallen to 8.6% of a total of 4 million people, and by 1990 they formed 5.9% of the country's 5 million people. This sharp decline has since levelled off to more modest annual declines.

An important contribution to the decline of Swedish speakers in Finland during the second half of the 20th century was that many Swedish speakers emigrated to Sweden. An estimated 30–50% of all Finnish citizens who moved to Sweden were Swedish-speaking Finns. Reliable statistics are not available, as the Swedish authorities, as opposed to their Finnish counterpart, do not register languages. Another reason is that the natural increase of the Finnish-speakers has been somewhat faster than that of the Swedish-speakers until recent times, when the trend has reversed.

During most of the 20th century, marriages across language borders tended to result in children becoming Finnish speakers, and knowledge of Swedish declined. During the last decades the trend has been reversed: many bilingual families chose to register their children as Swedish speakers and put their children in Swedish schools. One motive is the language skills needed during their professional lives. Population statistics do not recognize bilingualism.

Historical relationship of the Swedish- and Finnish-speaking populations
The Finnish substrate toponyms (place names) within today's Swedish-speaking areas have been interpreted as indicative of earlier Finnish settlements in the area. A toponymical analysis from e.g. the Turunmaa archipelago—today largely Swedish-speaking—suggests the existence of a large population of native Finnish speakers up until the early modern age. Whether the Finnish settlements prior to the arrival of the Swedes have been permanent or seasonal is debated. According to another toponymic study, some Finnish villages and farms on the south-western coast and the archipelago became Swedish-speaking by assimilation.

According to another view (e.g. Tarkiainen 2008) the two major areas of Swedish language speakers (Nyland and Ostrobothnia) were largely uninhabited at the time of the arrival of Swedes.

According to an interpretation based on the results of recent (2008) genome-wide SNP scans and on church records from the early modern period, Swedish-speaking peasantry has been overwhelmingly endogamous. Historian Tarkiainen (2008) presents that from the late Middle Ages onwards until relatively recent times, Swedish-speaking peasants tended to select their marriage partners from the same parish, often from the same village as themselves. This tends to be the rule among traditional peasant communities everywhere. As tightly-knit peasant communities tend to assimilate potential newcomers very quickly, this has meant that most marriages within the Swedish-speaking peasantry during this period were contracted with members of the same language group. During the time of early immigration by Swedes to the coastal regions (approximately between 1150 and 1350), the situation was different and according to a study from the 1970s (as referenced by Tarkiainen, 2008) the intermarriage rate between local Finns and Swedish newcomers was considerable. According to Tarkiainen, in the areas of initial Swedish immigration, the local Finns were assimilated into the Swedish-speaking population.

Culture, literature and folklore
Finland-Swedish folklore along the coast has been traditionally maritime-influenced. The folklore themes are typical in the Nordic context. Stories and tales involving the evil water-spirit are central. The origins of some of the tales have been German and French from which they have been adapted to the Nordic milieu. (Finland)-Swedish folklore has also had a significant impact on the folklore of Finnish speakers.

Finland-Swedish literature has a rich legacy. Under the lead of Edith Södergran, who also captivated audiences in English-speaking world, Gunnar Björling and Elmer Diktonius, the Finland-Swedish modernists of the early 20th century had a significant impact on the whole of Scandinavian modernism.

Tove Jansson is perhaps the most renowned example of Finland-Swedish prose. Her Moomin books have fascinated children and adults throughout the world.

On 6 November, Finnish Swedish Heritage Day, a general flag flying day, is celebrated in Finland; the day celebrates the Swedish-speaking population of Finland, their culture, and the bilinguality of Finland.

Genetics
In a 2008 study a joint analysis was performed for the first time on Swedish and Finnish autosomal genotypes. Swedish-speakers from Ostrobothnia (reference population of the study representing 40% of all Swedish-speakers in Finland) did not differ significantly from the neighbouring, adjacent Finnish-speaking populations but formed a genetic cluster with the Swedes and also the amount of genetic admixture between the groups which have taken place historically. According to a 2008 Y-DNA study, a Swedish-speaking reference group from Larsmo, Ostrobothnia, differed significantly from the Finnish-speaking sub-populations in the country in terms of Y-STR variation. This study however was comparing one small Swedish-speaking municipality of 4652 inhabitants to Finnish-speaking provinces and only tells about the origin of two different Y-DNA haplotypes.

Identity

According to a sociological study published in 1981, the Swedish-speaking Finns meet the four major criteria for a separate ethnic group: self-identification of ethnicity, language, social structure, and ancestry. However, not all Swedish-speaking Finns are willing to self-identify as representatives of a distinct ethnicity. The major political organisation representing the Swedish-speakers in Finland, the Swedish People's Party, has defined the Swedish-speaking Finns as a people who express Finnish identity in the Swedish language. The issue is debated: an opposite view is still that the Swedish-speaking Finns are a sub-group of the ethnic Swedes,  or "East Swedes".

Despite these varying viewpoints, the Swedish-speaking population in Finland in general have their own identity distinct from that of the majority, and they wish to be recognized as such. In speaking Swedish, Swedish-speaking Finns predominantly use the Swedish word  (approximately translatable as Finlanders) when referring to all Finnish nationals. The purpose is to use a term that includes both themselves and Finnish-speaking Finns because the Swedish word , in Finland-Swedish usage, implies a Finnish-speaking Finn.

In literature regarding to international law and minority rights, a view that the Swedish-speakers in Finland not only constitute an ethnic minority but a distinct nationality has also been presented.

Marriages between Swedish- and Finnish-speakers are nowadays very common. According to a study commissioned by the Swedish Assembly of Finland in 2005, 48.5% of all families with children where at least one of the parents was Swedish-speaking were bilingual in the sense of one parent being Swedish- and the other Finnish-speaking (only families living in those municipalities where Swedish was at least a co-official language were included in this study). 67.7% of the children from these bilingual families were registered as Swedish-speaking. The proportion of those who attended schools where Swedish was the language of instruction was even higher.  The Finnish authorities classify a person as a Swedish- or Finnish-speaker based only upon that person's (or parent's) own choice, which can be changed at any time. It is only possible to be registered either as Swedish- or Finnish-speaking, not both as in Canada, for example. It is significantly more common nowadays than it used to be for children from bilingual families to be registered as Swedish-speaking.

Historical predominance of the Swedish language among the gentry

Areas of modern-day Finland were integrated into the Swedish realm in the 13th century, at a time when that realm was still in the process of being formed. At the time of Late Middle Ages, Latin was still the language of instruction from the secondary school upwards and in use among the educated class and priests. As Finland was part of Sweden proper for 550 years, Swedish was the language of the nobility, administration and education. Hence the two highest estates of the realm, i.e. nobles and priests, had Swedish as their language. In the two minor estates, burghers and peasants, Swedish also held sway, but in a more varying degree depending on regional differences.

Most noble families of the medieval period arrived directly from Sweden. A significant minority of the nobility had foreign origins (predominantly German), but their descendants normally adopted Swedish as their first language.

The clergy in the earlier part the formation of the Lutheran Church (in its High Church form) was constituted most often of the wealthier strata of the peasantry with the closely linked medieval Finnish nobility and the rising burgher class in the expanding cities. The Church required fluency in Finnish from clergymen serving in predominantly or totally Finnish-speaking parishes (most of the country); consequently clerical families tended to maintain a high degree of functional bilingualism. Clerical families in the whole seem to have been more fluent in Finnish than the burghers as whole. In the Middle Ages, commerce in the Swedish realm, including Finland, was dominated by German merchants who immigrated in large numbers to the cities and towns of Sweden and Finland. As a result, the wealthier burghers in Sweden (and in cities as Turku (Åbo) and Vyborg (Viborg)) during the late Middle Ages tended to be of German origin. In the 19th century, a new wave of immigration came from German-speaking countries predominantly connected to commercial activities, which has formed a notable part of the grand bourgeoisie in Finland to this day.

After the Finnish war, Sweden lost Finland to Russia. During the period of Russian sovereignty (1809–1917) the Finnish language was promoted by the Russian authorities as a way to sever the cultural and emotional ties with Sweden and to counter the threat of a reunion with Sweden. Consequently, the Finnish language began to replace Swedish in the administrative and cultural sphere during the later part of the 19th century.

The rise of the Finnish language to an increasingly prevalent position in society was, at the outset, mainly a construct of eager promoters of the Finnish language from the higher strata of society, mainly with Swedish-speaking family backgrounds. A later development, especially at the beginning of the 20th century, was the adoption or translation or modification of Swedish surnames into Finnish (fennicization). This was generally done throughout the entire society. In upper-class families it was predominantly in cadet branches of families that the name translations took place.

Opposition to the Swedish language was partly based around historical prejudices and conflicts that had sprung up during the 19th century. The intensified language strife and the aspiration to raise the Finnish language and Finnic culture from peasant status to the position of a national language and a national culture gave rise to negative portrayals of Swedish speakers as foreign oppressors of the peaceful Finnish-speaking peasant.

Even though the proportional distribution of Swedish-speakers among different social strata closely reflects that of the general population, there is still a lingering conception of Swedish as a language of the historical upper class culture of Finland. This is reinforced by the fact that Swedish-speakers are statistically overrepresented among "old money" families as well as within the Finnish nobility consisting of about 6000 persons, of which about two thirds are Swedish-speakers. Still the majority of the Swedish-speaking Finns have traditionally been farmers and fishermen from the Finnish coastal municipalities and archipelago.

Bilingualism

Finland is a bilingual country according to its constitution. This means that members of the Swedish language minority have the right to communicate with the state authorities in their mother tongue.

On the municipal level, this right is legally restricted to municipalities with a certain minimum of speakers of the minority language. All Finnish communities and towns are classified as either monolingual or bilingual. When the proportion of the minority language increases to 8% (or 3000), then the municipality is defined as bilingual, and when it falls below 6%, the municipality becomes monolingual. In bilingual municipalities, all civil servants must have satisfactory language skill in either Finnish or Swedish (in addition to native-level skill in the other language). Both languages can be used in all communications with the civil servants in such a town. Public signs (such as street and traffic signs, as illustrated) are in both languages in bilingual towns and municipalities with the name in the majority language being on the top.

The Swedish-speaking areas in Finnish Mainland do not have fixed territorial protection, unlike the languages of several national minorities in Central Europe such as German in Belgium and North Italy. This has caused a heated debate among Swedish-speaking Finns. The current language act of Finland has been criticized as inadequate instrument to protect the linguistic rights of Swedish-speaking Finns in practice. The criticism was partly legitimized by the report (2008) conducted by Finnish government which showed severe problems in the practical implementation of the language act. The recent administrative reforms in Finland have caused harsh criticism in the Swedish-speaking media and created fear over the survival of Swedish as an administrative language in Finland. A special status in the form partial self-determination and fixed protection for Swedish language in Swedish-speaking municipalities have been proposed in Finland's Swedish-speaking media.

Following an educational reform in the 1970s, both Swedish and Finnish became compulsory school subjects. The school subjects are not called Finnish or Swedish; the primary language in which lessons are taught depends upon the pupil's mother tongue. This language of instruction is officially and in general practice called the mother tongue ( in Finnish,  in Swedish). The secondary language, as a school subject, is called the other domestic language ( in Finnish,  in Swedish). Lessons in the "other domestic language" usually start in the third, fifth or seventh form of comprehensive school and are a part of the curriculum in all secondary education. In polytechnics and universities, all students are required to pass an examination in the "other domestic language" on a level that enables them to be employed as civil servants in bilingual offices and communities. The actual linguistic abilities of those who have passed the various examinations however vary considerably.

Being a small minority usually leads to functional bilingualism. Swedish-speaking Finns are more fluent in Finnish than Finnish-speakers are in Swedish due to the practical matter of living in a predominantly Finnish-speaking country. In big cities with a significant Swedish-speaking population such as Helsinki and Turku, most of them are fluent in both Swedish and Finnish. Although in some municipalities Swedish is the only official language, Finnish is the dominant language in most towns and at most employers in Finland. In areas with a Finnish-speaking majority, Finnish is most often used when interacting with strangers and known Finnish speakers. However, 50% of all Swedish speakers live in areas in which Swedish is the majority language and in which they can use Swedish in all or most contexts (see demographics below).

Demographics
Of the Swedish-speaking population of Finland,

 44% live in officially bilingual towns and municipalities where Finnish dominates,
 41% live in officially bilingual towns and municipalities where Swedish dominates,
 9% live in Åland, of whose population about 90% was Swedish-speaking in 2010,
 6% live in officially monolingual Finnish-speaking towns and municipalities.

Swedish-speaking immigrants

There is a small community of Swedish-speaking immigrants in Finland. Many of them come from Sweden, or have resided there (about 8,500 Swedish citizens live in Finland and around 30,000 residents in Finland were born in Sweden), while others have opted for Swedish because it is the main language in the city in which they live, or because their partners are Swedish-speaking. About one quarter of immigrants in the Helsinki area would choose to integrate in Swedish if they had the option. According to a report by Finland's Swedish think tank, Magma, there is a widespread perception among immigrants that they are more easily integrated in the Swedish-speaking community than in the majority society. However, some immigrants also question whether they ever will be fully accepted as Finland Swedes. Swedish-speaking immigrants also have their own association, Ifisk, and in the capital region there is a publicly financed project named Delaktig aimed at facilitating integration of immigrants who know or wish to learn Swedish. Most if not all immigrants also wish to be fluent in Finnish due to the fact that it is the dominant language in Finnish society.

Diaspora
Swedish speakers have migrated to many parts of the world. One study has shown they are more likely to emigrate than the rest of the Finnish population. It is estimated that between the early 1870s and late 1920s, approximately 70,000 Swedish-speaking Finns emigrated to North America. In Minnesota, a number settled on the Iron Range, in Minneapolis-Saint Paul, and in the northeastern part of the state including Duluth and along the North Shore of Lake Superior. Larsmont, Minnesota, a town named after Larsmo, Finland, was founded by Swedish-speaking Finns in the early 1900s.

For a number of reasons, including geographical and linguistic reasons, Sweden has traditionally been the number one destination for Swedish-speaking emigrants. In one study covering the period 2000–2015, over half of the 26,000 Swedish-speaking Finns who had moved abroad moved to Sweden. There are about 200,000 Swedish-speaking Finns living in Sweden, according to Finnish broadcaster Yle. Due to noticeable differences between Finland Swedish and Swedish as spoken in Sweden, Swedish-speaking Finns have been mistaken for non-native speakers and have been required to take language courses. Groups, particularly  (Fris), an interest group, have campaigned for decades in Sweden for recognition as an official national minority group, in addition to the five existing recognized groups: Sámi, Jews, Romani, Sweden Finns, and Tornedalians. The issue has been debated in the Swedish Parliament (Riksdag) several times, with the 2017 attempt failing due to the ethnic group not being established in the country prior to 1900.

The Swedish-Finn Historical Society is a Washington state, USA-based association which aims to preserve the ethnic group's emigration history.

From 1990 to 2021, a total of 50,034 Swedish-speaking Finns have emigrated abroad. 76.5% moved to other Nordic countries. The most popular destinations were;
 32,867 (65.7%)
 3,437 (6.9%)
 1,872 (3.7%)
 1,720 (3.4%)
 1,446 (2.9%)
 1,352 (2.7%)
 932 (1.9%)
 495 (1.0%)
 115 (0.2%)

In 2021, 1,432 Finland-Swedes moved abroad, which was the lowest amount since 1996. Emigration peaked during 2015-2018, when nearly 2,000 emigrated annually. They made up 20.1% of Finnish emigrants in 2021. Net migration of Swedish-speakers from Sweden was 256 in 2021.

Notable Swedish-speakers from Finland

 Lars Ahlfors, mathematician,  Fields Medal winner
 Antti Ahlström, industrialist and founder of the Ahlstrom Corporation
 Gustaf Mauritz Armfelt, courtier and diplomat, and in Finland, he is considered one of the great Finnish statesmen
 Niklas Bäckström, ice hockey goaltender for the Minnesota Wild of the NHL
 Hjalmar von Bonsdorff, Admiral, first governor of Åland and politician
 Jörn Donner, writer, film director, actor, producer and politician
 Albert Edelfelt, painter
 Johan Albrecht Ehrenström, architect and chairman of the committee in charge of rebuilding the city of Helsinki
 Johan Casimir Ehrnrooth, soldier in the service of Imperial Russia, who also acted as Prime Minister of Bulgaria
 Arvid Adolf Etholén, Naval officer employed by the Russian-American Company
 Karl-August Fagerholm, three times Prime Minister of Finland
 Kaj Franck, leading figure in Finnish design
 Akseli Gallen-Kallela, painter best known for his illustrations of the Kalevala (the Finnish national epic)
 Ragnar Granit, scientist, Nobel laureate in physiology or medicine in 1967
 Marcus Grönholm, rally driver, two-time world champion
 Bengt Holmström, Nobel laureate in economic sciences
 Fredrik Idestam, mining engineer and businessman, best known as a founder of Nokia
 Tove Jansson, painter, illustrator, writer, creator of Moomin characters
 Eero Järnefelt, realist painter
 Pernilla Karlsson, singer
 Linda Lampenius, classical violinist
 Kevin Lankinen, ice hockey goaltender for the Chicago Blackhawks of the NHL
 Mathias Lillmåns, vocalist of folk/black metal band Finntroll
 Magnus Lindberg, composer
 Isak Elliot Lundén, singer-songwriter
 Gustaf Mannerheim, Marshal and President of Finland, commander-in-chief during the Winter War
 Gustaf Nordenskiöld, explorer of the cliff dwellings of Mesa Verde, Colorado; son of Adolf Erik Nordenskiöld
 Adolf Erik Nordenskiöld, Arctic explorer, first to conquer the Northeast passage and circumnavigate Eurasia; father of Gustaf Nordenskiöld
 Paradise Oskar, singer-songwriter (real name: Axel Ehnström)
 Kebu, keyboard player, songwriter, producer (real name: Sebastian Teir)
 Emil von Qvanten, poet and politician
 Johan Ludvig Runeberg, romantic writer and Finland's national poet
 Helene Schjerfbeck, painter
 André Linman, musician
 Jean Sibelius, classical composer
 Krista Siegfrids, pop musician
 Janina Orlov, translator
 Johan Vilhelm Snellman, influential Fennoman philosopher and Finnish statesman
 Lars Sonck, architect
 Bengt Idestam-Almquist, the "father of Swedish film criticism"
 Kaarlo Juho Ståhlberg, 1st President of Finland
 Pehr Evind Svinhufvud, 3rd President of Finland
 Edith Södergran, modernist poet
 Eric Tigerstedt, Finnish inventor at the beginning of the 20th century, often referred to as the "Thomas Edison of Finland"
 Zacharias Topelius, journalist, historian and author
 Linus Torvalds, software engineer, creator of the Linux kernel
 Michael Widenius, software programmer and the main author of the original version of the open source MySQL relational database management system
 Rudolf Walden, industrialist and general
 Martin Wegelius, composer, musicologist, and founder of the Sibelius Academy
 Georg Henrik von Wright, philosopher

See also

 Demographics of Finland 
 Svenskfinland
 Finland Swedish – the language spoken by the Finland Swedes
 Finnish people – the ethnic groups of Finns
 Swedish people – the ethnic group of Swedes
 Sweden Finns – people of Finnish descent in Sweden
 Diocese of Borgå
 Swedish unit of the Finnish Broadcasting Company
 Swedish Assembly of Finland
 List of Swedish-speaking Finns
 List of Swedish-speaking and bilingual municipalities of Finland
 Svecoman movement
 Fennoman movement
 Fennicization
 Finlandssvensk samling
 Yle FSR

Notes

References

External links

The Finland-Swedish information and cultural center
Swedish People's Party
Society of Swedish Literature in Finland